Alexandrea Weis (born in New Orleans) is an American novelist.

She was educated as a nurse. She has written a number of novels about New Orleans.

Her unique style and ability to exquisitely define characters, makes her one of a growing number of popular writers from the region. She uses her experiences with the people and culture of the area to bring a new approach to New Orleans fiction. She has received national recognition and won several writing awards for her work.

She is married; they live in New Orleans.

Books
To My Senses, Booksurge LLC, 2007, 
Recovery, CreateSpace, 2011, 
Sacrifice, World Castle Publishing, 2011, 
Broken Wings, World Castle Publishing, 2012, 
The Secret Brokers, World Castle Publishing, 2012, 
Diary of a One-Night Stand, World Castle Publishing, 2012, 
Acadian Waltz, World Castle Publishing, 2013, 
The Satyr's Curse, World Castle Publishing, 2013, 
The Ghosts of Rue Dumaine, World Castle Publishing, 2013, 
Cover to Covers, World Castle Publishing, 2014, 
The Riding Master, World Castle Publishing, 2014, 
The Bondage Club, WEBA Publishing, 2014, 
The Satyr's Curse II: The Reckoning, World Castle Publishing, 2014, 
That Night with You, WEBA Publishing, 2014, 
Behind the Door, with M. Clarke, WEBA Publishing, 2015, 
Taming Me, WEBA Publishing, 2015, 
Rival Seduction, WEBA Publishing, 2015,  
The Art of Sin, WEBA Publishing, 2015, 
Dark Perception, WEBA Publishing, 2016, 
Dark Attraction, WEBA Publishing, 2016, 
His Dark Canvas, WEBA Publishing, 2016, 
The Satyr's Curse III: Redemption, WEBA Publishing, 2016, 
Blackwell, Vesuvian Books, 2017, 
Her Dark Past, WEBA Publishing, 2017, 
Damned: A Magnus Blackwell Novel Book 1, Vesuvian Books, 2017, 
Bound: A Magnus Blackwell Novel Book 2, Vesuvian Books, 2018, 
Death by the River, Vesuvian Books, 2018, 
Seize: A Magnus Blackwell Novel Book 3, Vesuvian Books, 2019, 
Realm, Vesuvian Books, 2019, 
The Secret Brokers, Vesuvian Books, 2020, 
Sisters of the Moon, Vesuvian Books, 2020.   
The Christmas Spirit, Rosewind Books, 2020, 
Have You Seen Me?, Vesuvian Books, 2021, 
River of Ashes, Book 1 St. Benedict Series, Vesuvian Books, 2022, 
River of Wrath, Book 2 St. Benedict Series, Vesuvian Books, 2023,

References

External links
Author's website
http://blogcritics.org/books/article/interview-alexandrea-weis-author-of-recovery/
http://beyondthebooks.wordpress.com/2011/05/01/interview-with-recovery-alexandrea-weis/
https://web.archive.org/web/20120112132940/http://literalexposure.com/2011/05/04/guest-post-by-alexandrea-weis-author-of-recovery/

Year of birth missing (living people)
21st-century American novelists
American women novelists
Writers from New Orleans
Living people
21st-century American women writers
Novelists from Louisiana